Lamboley Peak is a prominent peak in the northwest part of Prehn Peninsula, Orville Coast, Antarctica. The peak was first photographed by the Ronne Antarctic Research Expedition, 1947–48, and was mapped by the United States Geological Survey from surveys and U.S. Navy air photos, 1961–67. It was named by the Advisory Committee on Antarctic Names after Paul E. Lamboley, a radioman at South Pole Station in 1964.

References

Mountains of Palmer Land